Sebastian Dyk (born 24 September 1992) is a Swedish ice hockey player. He is currently playing with HIFK in the Liiga.

References

External links

1992 births
Asplöven HC players
HIFK (ice hockey) players
HV71 players
Living people
Malmö Redhawks players
Swedish ice hockey right wingers
Sportspeople from Malmö